Events from the year 1710 in art.

Events

Paintings
 Aert de Gelder – The Baptism of Christ (Fitzwilliam Museum, Cambridge) (approximate date)
 Thomas Gibson – Portrait of Henry Sacheverell
 Godfrey Kneller – Portrait of Admiral George Delaval MP
 Antoine Pesne – Portrait of Margrave Christian Ludwig of Brandenburg-Schwedt
 Sebastiano Ricci (Bergamo)
 Assumption
 Call of Saint Peter
 Christ delivers the keys to Saint Peter
 Liberation of Saint Peter
 John Verelst – Four Mohawk Kings

Births
 March 4 – Aert Schouman, Dutch painter, glass engraver and art dealer (died 1792)
 March 8 – Gaetano Majorano, Italian castrato and opera singer (died 1783)
 May 8 – Peter Anton von Verschaffelt, Flemish sculptor and architect (died 1793)
 May 23 – François Gaspard Adam, French rococo sculptor (died 1781)
 August 22 – Johann August Nahl, German sculptor and stucco artist (died 1781)
 August 27 – Giuseppe Vasi, Italian artist (died 1782)
 September 3 – Abraham Trembley, Swiss naturalist and zoological artist (died 1784)
 October 4 – Count Augustin Ehrensvärd, Swedish military architect and painter (died 1772)
 October 11 – Christophe-Gabriel Allegrain, French sculptor in the neoclassical style (died 1795)
 December 15 – Francesco Zahra, Maltese painter (died 1773)
 date unknown
 Pierre-Charles Canot, French engraver who spent most of his career in England (died 1777)
 Francesco Foschi, Italian landscape painter (died 1780)
 Yi Insang, Korean painter and government officer in the late Joseon period (died 1760)
 José Luzán, Spanish Baroque painter (died 1785)
 Michele Marieschi, Italian painter of landscapes or vistas (a vedutisti) (died 1743)
 Tibout Regters, Dutch portrait painter (died 1768)
 Jean Valade, French painter (died 1787)
 Yi Insang, Korean painter of the later Joseon period (died 1760)
 probable
 Jean Baptiste Claude Chatelain, French engraver (died 1771)
 Georg Franz Ebenhech, German sculptor (died 1757) 
 Marcos Zapata, Peruvian Quechua painter (died 1773)

Deaths
 January 30 – Madeleine Boullogne, French painter (born 1646)
 September 20 – Margherita Caffi, Italian woman painter of still life (born 1650)
 September 21 – Joseph Werner, Swiss miniaturist (born 1637)
 October 5 – John Baptist Medina, Flemish-Spanish portrait painter and illustrator of Paradise Lost (born 1659)
 date unknown
 Germain Audran, French engraver (born 1631)
 Giovanni Antonio Fumiani, Italian painter (born 1645)
 Heinrich Charasky, Hungarian sculptor (born 1656)
 Jacob Leyssens, Flemish painter and decorator from the Baroque (born 1661)
 Basilio Santa Cruz Pumacallao, Quechua painter from Cusco, Peru (born 1635)
 Johann Gustav Stockenberg, Swedish sculptor and stonemason (born 1660)
 Sebastiano Taricco, Italian painter (born 1645)
 Anna Maria Thelott, Swedish engraver, illustrator, woodcut-artist, and miniaturist painter (born 1683)
 Girolamo Troppa, Italian painter (born 1637)
 Giovanni Francesco Venturini, Italian painter and engraver (born 1650)
 Simon Pietersz Verelst, Dutch Golden Age painter (born 1644)
 Giuseppe Zimbalo, Italian architect and sculptor (born 1617)
 1710/1715: Jean Cornu, French sculptor (born 1650)
 
Years of the 18th century in art
1710s in art